Ice wall is the edge of an ice shelf. It may also refer to:

Pimpirev Ice Wall, Livingston Island, Antarctica
IceWall SSO, a Web and Federated single sign-on software
The Wall, a 700 foot tall structure made out of ice in the fictional world of A Song of Ice and Fire series of novels by George R. R. Martin and its adaptations
 Antarctica, the edge of a flat model of the Earth, according to Flat Earthers